Walter Arthur Wellham (17 September 1932 – ) is a former Australian cricketer who had a brief first class cricket career in the 1959/60 season for New South Wales cricket team. 

A slow left-arm orthodox spin bowler, Wellham played Sydney Grade Cricket for Western Suburbs District Cricket Club before making his first-class debut for New South Wales. He collected 19 wickets from his seven appearances at a bowling average of 23.26 runs per wicket. His nephew, Dirk Wellham, was an Australian Test and One Day International player.
Wally Welham was a much-loved and respected high school principal, his schools including Blacktown Boys High School in NSW.

See also
 List of New South Wales representative cricketers

References

External links
 

1932 births
Living people
Australian cricketers
New South Wales cricketers
People from New South Wales